Luca Guadagnino (born 10 August 1971) is an Italian film director, producer, and screenwriter. His films are characterized by their emotional complexity, sensuality, and sumptuous visuals. He is also known for his frequent collaborations with actors Tilda Swinton, Dakota Johnson, Timothée Chalamet and Michael Stuhlbarg, editor Walter Fasano and screenwriter David Kajganich.

Born in Palermo, Guadagnino spent part of his childhood in Ethiopia, but emigrated back to Italy with his family to escape the Ethiopian Civil War. He began his career directing short films and documentaries. He made his feature-film debut with The Protagonists (1999), the first of his many collaborations with Swinton. His follow-up Melissa P. (2005), based on the book of Melissa Panarello, was a commercial success in Italy but was met with mixed critical reception.

Guadagnino gained further acclaim with his Desire Trilogy which consists of the films: I Am Love (2009), A Bigger Splash (2015),  and Call Me by Your Name (2017). The latter, brought him international recognition, and marked the start of his creative partnership with Chalamet. Suspiria (2018) marked his first foray into the horror genre; a remake of the 1977 film, it polarized critics and was deemed a box office failure. The film was followed by We Are Who We Are (2020) a coming-of-age miniseries for HBO, and the romantic horror film Bones and All (2022). Over his career he has received numerous accolades, including a Silver Lion, alongside nominations for an Academy Award and three BAFTA Awards.

Guadagnino has directed several documentaries including Bertolucci on Bertolucci (2013) and Salvatore: The Shoemaker of Dreams (2020). Aside from filmmaking, he has also been involved in the world of fashion, having directed adverts for brands, such as Fendi and Salvatore Ferragamo.

Early life and education
Guadagnino was born on 10 August 1971 in Palermo to an Italian father from Canicattì, Sicily, and an Algerian mother who grew up in Casablanca. He spent his early childhood in Ethiopia, where his father taught history and Italian literature at a technical school in Addis Ababa. The family left Ethiopia for Italy in 1977 to escape the Ethiopian Civil War, settling in Palermo.

Guadagnino became interested in filmmaking from around the age of nine, and started making amateur films after receiving a Super 8 camera from his mother. He developed a passion for cinema in earnest during adolescence and programmed VHS recordings of films shown on television. Some of the films cited as his early influences include Psycho (1960), Suspiria (1977) and Starman (1984). He also developed a particular fondness for the films of Ingmar Bergman. As a teenager, Guadagnino was a registered member of the Italian Communist Party, and wrote for the Palermo youth wing newspaper. He resigned his membership after a dispute with the newspaper editor, over the content of one of his interviews.

Guadagnino studied literature at the University of Palermo. He then transferred to the Sapienza University of Rome and completed his degree in literature and cinema history, with a thesis on the American filmmaker Jonathan Demme. At Sapienza he met actress Laura Betti and would often attend her parties and cook for guests, such as Bernardo Bertolucci and Valerio Adami. Guadagnino would later describe that experience as his "film school".

Career

Early work (1999–2008)
Guadagnino made his directorial debut with the feature film The Protagonists (1999), which was presented at the Venice Film Festival. The film also marks his first collaboration with actresses Tilda Swinton, Fabrizia Sacchi, and editor Walter Fasano. In 2002, he directed Mundo Civilizado, a musical documentary, presented at the Locarno Film Festival in 2003. His 2004 documentary film Cuoco Contadino, which follows Italian chef Paolo Masieri, was presented at the Venice Film Festival. His second feature film, erotic drama Melissa P. starring Spanish actress María Valverde, made a successful debut the following year.

Desire trilogy and other work (2009–2017)
In 2009, he directed, wrote, and produced the cult hit I Am Love. The first installment in Guadagnino's self-described Desire trilogy, was co-produced, and developed by Tilda Swinton —who also stars in the film— over a 7-year period. Presented at a number of international festivals, the film was an immediate success with critics and audiences alike. In 2010, it was nominated for the Academy Award for Best Costume Design, the Golden Globe for Best Foreign Film, and the BAFTA Award for Best Film Not in the English Language.

In 2011, Guadagnino directed Inconscio Italiano, a feature-length documentary film presented at the Locarno Film Festival. His work in documentary continued with Bertolucci on Bertolucci (2013), which was shown at the Venice Film Festival, the London Film Festival and Paris Cinemathèque, and 50 other festivals in 2013 and 2014. Co-directed with Walter Fasano, the documentary was made entirely from archival material and received top international accolades.

As producer he realized the well-received short film Diarchia (2010), directed by Ferdinando Cito Filomarino and starring Guadagnino collaborator Alba Rohrwacher, the short won the Pianifica prize at the Locarno Film Festival, received a special mention at the Sundance Film Festival in 2011, was nominated for Best Short Film at the European Film Awards, and won the prize for Best Director of a Short Film at the Nastri d'Argento. Two years later he produced Edoardo Gabbriellini's feature film Padroni di casa, presented at the Locarno Film Festival. In 2015, Guadagnino produced Filomarino's debut feature film Antonia, a biopic about Italian poet Antonia Pozzi. Filomarino was inspired by Guadagnino's love of Pozzi's poetry to make the film.

In 2015, Guadagnino directed the second installment of the Desire Trilogy, erotic thriller A Bigger Splash, with Tilda Swinton, Matthias Schoenaerts, Ralph Fiennes and Dakota Johnson. The film is loosely based on the 1969 Jacques Deray film La Piscine. It had its premiere at the 72nd Venice Film Festival where it competed for the Golden Lion. 

Guadagnino's next film was Call Me by Your Name, an adaptation of André Aciman's novel of the same name, starring Timothée Chalamet, Armie Hammer, and Michael Stuhlbarg. Filming took place in Crema, Italy, in May and June 2016, and the film debuted at the 2017 Sundance Film Festival. It was theatrically released in the United Kingdom on 27 October 2017, and in the United States on 24 November.

International recognition (2017–present)

In September 2015, Guadagnino announced at the 72nd Venice Film Festival his plans to direct a remake of Dario Argento's Suspiria. Guadagnino set his version in Berlin circa 1977—the year in which the original film was released—and aimed to focus on "the concept [and...] uncompromising force of motherhood." Tilda Swinton and Dakota Johnson starred in the film, reuniting from Guadagnino's A Bigger Splash. Shooting began in Italy in October 2016, and concluded on 10 March 2017, in Berlin. Suspiria premiered at the 75th Venice Film Festival and polarized critics.

In May 2017, it was announced Guadagnino was attached to direct Rio from a screenplay by Steven Knight, with Benedict Cumberbatch and Jake Gyllenhaal to star. In November 2017, Michelle Williams joined the project. However, as was revealed in a profile for The New Yorker, the timing did not work out and Guadagnino subsequently left the project.

In January 2019, it was announced Guadagnino had directed The Staggering Girl a short film, starring Julianne Moore, Kyle MacLachlan, Marthe Keller, KiKi Layne, Mia Goth and Alba Rohrwacher. The 35-minute short  premiered during the 2019 Cannes Directors' Fortnight section. The following year, Guadagnino served as an executive producer on The Truffle Hunters, a documentary film directed by Michael Dweck and Gregory Kirshaw, which had its world premiere at the Sundance Film Festival. and directed Salvatore Ferragamo: The Shoemaker of Dreams a documentary film revolving around Salvatore Ferragamo. The film had its world premiere at the Venice Film Festival on 5 September 2020.

He also wrote and directed We Are Who We Are an 8-episode limited series for HBO, starring Chloë Sevigny, Kid Cudi, Alice Braga, Jack Dylan Grazer, Spence Moore II, Jordan Kristine Seamon, Faith Alabi, Corey Knight, Tom Mercier, Francesca Scorsese, Ben Taylor and Sebastiano Pigazzi. It premiered on 14 September 2020.  In 2021, Guadagnino served as a producer on Beckett —previously named, Born to be Murdered— directed by Ferdinando Cito Filomarino starring Alicia Vikander and John David Washington.

On 28 January 2021, it was reported that Guadagnino was going to direct an adaptation of Camille DeAngelis's 2015 novel about teenage cannibals Bones & All, with Timothée Chalamet and Taylor Russell in talks to star. The film, Bones and All, had its world premiere at the 79th Venice International Film Festival on 2 September 2022, where it won Silver Lion for best direction.

Upcoming projects
On 14 May 2020, Variety announced that Antoine Fuqua was no longer directing the Scarface remake and that Guadagnino signed on to direct the film with the script still being written by the Coen brothers as previously confirmed.

Guadagnino is attached to direct multiple projects including Burial Rites, based on the 2013 novel of the same name, with Jennifer Lawrence producing and starring as Agnes Magnúsdóttir, the last woman executed in Iceland, for TriStar Pictures, and a biographical film about Hollywood hustler Scotty Bowers. Guadagnino also expressed interest and is planning a sequel to Call Me by Your Name. He is also attached to direct an adaption of Lord of the Flies, with Patrick Ness adapting the book for Warner Bros. Guadagnino is also in talks with the Kubrick estate about possibly directing Stanley Kubrick's unrealized Holocaust project Aryan Papers. 

On 6 January 2022, it was announced that Guadagnino will direct a biographical film about Audrey Hepburn for Apple TV+ with Rooney Mara playing the lead. On 11 February 2022, he was set to direct sports drama film Challengers starring Zendaya, Josh O'Connor & Mike Faist. He is set to produce an Italian movie titled Diciannove. He is set to direct a film adaptation of William S. Burroughs novel Queer with Daniel Craig in the lead.

Other activities
Guadagnino has served twice on the jury of the Torino Film Festival: in 2003 for the Short Film section and in 2006 for the Official Jury. In 2010, he was a member of the Venice Film Festival. In 2011, he served as president of the Beirut Film Festival, and on the jury of the Locarno Film Festival.

Outside of film, he began working with the Italian fashion house Fendi in 2005. and in 2012 created Frenesy, a creative agency and production company that conceives and implements communications for luxury brands and produces fashion films, video and print advertising, and high-profile creative events.

Guadagnino headed the jury for Louis Vuitton's Journey Awards in 2012, an international competition dedicated to young filmmakers. He also participated as a jury member in the first edition of Fashion Film Festival Milano in 2014, chaired by Franca Sozzani, chief editor of Vogue Italia. In December 2011, he made his debut as an opera director with Falstaff by Giuseppe Verdi at the Teatro Filarmonico in Verona, Italy.

Influences and style
Guadagnino cited seeing the desert in the film Lawrence of Arabia at age five, as his "first impression of a screen, which had nothing to do with the actual film." Despite being influenced by Italian filmmakers such as Bernardo Bertolucci, Roberto Rossellini, Pier Paolo Pasolini and Federico Fellini, Guadagnino does not consider himself an Italian filmmaker, and would rather be seen as an Algerian one, saying: "[...] I grew up in Ethiopia. I came to Italy when I was seven. In my mind, deep emotions and visual landscapes are from Ethiopia and not Palermo or any place in Italy. I arrived in Italy as an outsider." He has also said during his youth he was an “isolated” person who was “healing” himself with cinema and “finding a lot of solace” in horror movies. Other directors Guadagnino cites as influences include Alfred Hitchcock, Jean-Luc Godard, Nagisa Oshima, Rainer Werner Fassbinder, and Douglas Sirk. For the 2012 Sight & Sound directors' poll, Guadagnino listed, The Blue Gardenia, Come and Go, Fanny and Alexander, The Fury, Goodbye South, Goodbye, Histoire(s) du cinéma, In the Realm of the Senses, Journey to Italy, Psycho and Veronika Voss as his favourite films.

Frequent collaborators
Guadagnino usually has a long standing group of actors and crew who participate on most of his work. Actors who usually appear on his films include, Tilda Swinton, Fabrizia Sacchi, Alba Rohrwacher, Timothée Chalamet, Dakota Johnson, and Michael Stuhlbarg. Swinton has appeared in four of his films and was the subject of the documentary short Tilda Swinton: The Love Factory. Sacchi has appeared in three of his features and various other projects, such as the short films L'uommo risacca and The Staggering Girl, as well as in the documentary Mundo Civilizado. Rohrwacher has also appeared in The Staggering Girl as well as in the Guadagnino produced short Diarchia. Aside from starring in Call Me By Your Name and Bones and All, Chalamet also had a small cameo in We Are Who We Are.

Yorick Le Saux and Sayombhu Mukdeeprom are Guadagnino's most frequent cinematographers. Le Saux has worked in I Am Love, A Bigger Splash, three episodes of We Are Who We Are, and several of Guadagnino's fashion films. Mukdeeprom shot his two most recent films, Antonia and Beckett, as well as the short film The Staggering Girl.

Walter Fasano has been Guadagnino's main editor since 1997, having worked in every project of his except for We Are Who We Are.  Guadagnino regularly works with producers, Francesco Melzi d'Eril, Marco Morabito, and screenwriter David Kajganich.

Personal life
He lives and works in a 17th-century palazzo in Crema. From 2009 to 2020, Guadagnino was in a relationship with Ferdinando Cito Filomarino.

Filmography

Feature films

Documentaries

Short films

Television

Music videos

Advertising

Awards and nominations

See also
List of LGBTQ Academy Award winners and nominees

References

External links

 
 
 

1971 births
20th-century Italian LGBT people
21st-century Italian LGBT people
Film people from Palermo
Gay screenwriters
Italian film directors
Italian male screenwriters
Italian LGBT screenwriters
Italian people of Algerian descent
21st-century Italian screenwriters
LGBT film directors
Italian gay writers
Living people
Sapienza University of Rome alumni
Venice Best Director Silver Lion winners